The 1903 International Cross Country Championships was held in Hamilton, Scotland, at the Hamilton Park on 28 March 1903. 
A preview of the event and an appraisal of the results appeared in the Glasgow Herald.

Complete results, medallists, 
 and the results of British athletes were published.

Medallists

Individual Race Results

Men's (8.5 mi /13.7 km)

Team Results

Men's

Participation
An unofficial count yields the participation of 45 athletes from 4 countries.

 (12)
 (9)
 (12)
 (12)

See also
 1903 in athletics (track and field)

References

International Cross Country Championships
International Cross Country Championships
International Cross Country Championships
International athletics competitions hosted by Scotland
Cross country running in the United Kingdom
20th century in South Lanarkshire
Hamilton, South Lanarkshire
Sport in South Lanarkshire
International Cross Country Championships